Larry Haynes (1910s – Unknown) was a Canadian football end who played and coached the Calgary Bronks (now known as the Calgary Stampeders). He played from 1936 to 1940, and in 1946. Haynes was the head coach of the Bronks in 1940. He was named All-Western in 1936, 1937, and 1938 as well as All-Canada in 1939 and 1941 (he played with the Vancouver Grizzlies in 1941). In his one season as coach, he had a 4–4 record. He later coached the Vancouver Fighting Irish football and basketball teams before serving in World War II.

References

1910s births
Year of birth missing
Year of death missing
Calgary Stampeders players
Calgary Stampeders coaches